Riccardo Fraccari (born 30 May 1949 in Pisa, Italy) is a world sport administrator, holding various high-ranking positions, most notably as president of the World Baseball Softball Confederation and International Baseball Federation. In August 2016 under Fraccari, the International Olympic Committee voted to reinstate baseball and softball as Olympic sports for the Tokyo 2020 Games. He was elected WBSC president in May, 2014 for the first term, re-elected in July, 2022, for the second term, and after completing his first term from 2014 to 2021, is now currently serving a second full 7-year term.

Fraccari was elected as president of the International Baseball Federation in December 2009, succeeding American Harvey Schiller, and immediately set out to hold merger discussions with the International Softball Federation. He spearheaded negotiations to consolidate international baseball and softball to establish and successfully launch the World Baseball Softball Confederation in October 2012, uniting baseball and softball's global movements and streamlining the two sports' efforts to return to the Olympic Games.

In February 2015, Fraccari appointed Antonio Castro, the son of former Cuban leader Fidel Castro, as WBSC Global Ambassador and Kenyon & Kenyon Washington D.C.-based attorney Edward Colbert, brother of American political satirist Stephen Colbert, as WBSC General Counsel.

In less than three years since overseeing the establishment of the WBSC, Fraccari has elevated the new world ruling body to be considered among the Top 30 "Ultimate Sports Federations" in the world.

Fraccari has expanded international baseball properties to include a new flagship world tournament, the WBSC Premier 12 Professional Baseball National Team Championship, and also the Under-12 Baseball World Cup and the Under-21 Baseball World Cup, which impact baseball's World Rankings.

Under Fraccari, the world governing body for baseball also established the first-ever "Europe" team to compete in officially recognized international competitions, setting a historical precedent.

Fraccari also serves as the current chairman of the Italian National Olympic Committee's (CONI) International Relations Exploratory Committee and is a member of the CONI Council. He was appointed a member of CONI's highest authoritative body, the Executive Board ("Giunta"), in August 2018.

In May 2013, Fraccari was elected as the Secretary General of the Association of IOC Recognised International Sports Federations.

In April 2018, Bulgaria's National Sports Academy of Sofia named Fraccari an Honorary Professor.

In May 2018, the WBSC under Fraccari established Baseball5, a new street/urban baseball discipline that only requires a ball.

Fraccari is also an advisory board member of the global sports think tank, Doha GOALS.

Fraccari is fluent in English, French, Italian and Spanish.

Education
Fraccari is a retired professor of organic chemistry at the Livorno Technical Institute (Istituto Tecnico Industriale "Galileo Galilei") and also studied law at the University of Pisa.

Honours and decorations

  : Knight of Merit of the Italian Republic
  : Italian National Olympic Committee "Gold Star of Sport Merit"
  : Honorary Professor, Bulgaria National Sports Academy
  : Title Honoris Causa of Bulgaria

Personal
Fraccari is married to a Swiss national; the couple have one son who graduated in law from LUISS "Guido Carli" University in Rome. Fraccari splits his residence between Livorno and Rome, Italy.

References

1949 births
Baseball executives
University of Pisa alumni
Living people
People from Pisa
Italian referees and umpires